{{DISPLAYTITLE:C10H12N2}}
The molecular formula C10H12N2 (molar mass: 160.22 g/mol) may refer to:

 Anabaseine
 Anatabine
 Echinopsidine
 Tolazoline
 Tryptamine

Molecular formulas